The 2016 Western Kentucky Hilltoppers football team represented Western Kentucky University (WKU) in the 2016 NCAA Division I FBS football season. The Hilltoppers played their home games at the Houchens Industries–L. T. Smith Stadium in Bowling Green, Kentucky, and competed in the East Division of Conference USA (C–USA). They were led by third year head coach Jeff Brohm. They finished the season 11–3, 7–1 in C-USA play to win a share of the East Division title with Old Dominion. Due to their head-to-head victory over Old Dominion, Western Kentucky represented the East Division in the Conference USA Championship Game where they defeated Louisiana Tech to be crowned C-USA champions. They were invited to the Boca Raton Bowl where they defeated Memphis.  This team led the NCAA in Scoring Offense.

On December 5, head coach Jeff Brohm resigned to become the head coach at Purdue. He finished at WKU with a record of 30–10, two bowl wins, and two C-USA titles. Defensive coordinator Nick Holt led the Hilltoppers in the Boca Raton Bowl.

Schedule
Western Kentucky announced its 2016 football schedule on February 4, 2016. The 2016 schedule consisted of 6 home and away games in the regular season. The Hilltoppers hosted C–USA foes Florida International (FIU), North Texas, Old Dominion, and Rice, and traveled to Florida Atlantic, Louisiana Tech, Marshall, and Middle Tennessee.

Western Kentucky's four non-conference games included two home games against Houston Baptist from the Southland Conference and Vanderbilt from the Southeastern Conference (SEC), and two road games against Alabama from the SEC and Miami (Ohio) from the Mid-American Conference (MAC).

Game summaries

Rice

at Alabama

at Miami (OH)

Vanderbilt

Houston Baptist

at Louisiana Tech

at Middle Tennessee

Old Dominion

at Florida Atlantic

FIU

North Texas

at Marshall

vs. Louisiana Tech–C-USA Championship Game

vs. Memphis–Boca Raton Bowl

Rankings

References

Western Kentucky
Western Kentucky Hilltoppers football seasons
Conference USA football champion seasons
Boca Raton Bowl champion seasons
Western Kentucky Hilltoppers football